Poolman is an upcoming mystery comedy film directed, produced, co-written, and starring Chris Pine in his directorial debut.

Premise
A man tending to the swimming pool uncovers a sizeable water heist, one in the same vein as Chinatown.

Cast
 Chris Pine as Darren Barrenman
 Annette Bening as Diane
 Danny DeVito as Jack
 Ariana DeBose
 Jennifer Jason Leigh
 DeWanda Wise
 Ray Wise as Van Patterson

Production
It was announced in February 2022 that Chris Pine was set to make his directorial debut on the film, which he co-wrote the screenplay for with Ian Gotler. Pine will also star in the film alongside Annette Bening and Danny DeVito. Pine came up with the idea for the film during a conversation with director Patty Jenkins, who will serve as a producer. In May, Ariana DeBose and Jennifer Jason Leigh were added to the cast, with Matthew Jensen set as cinematographer. In July, DeWanda Wise joined the cast.

Filming began in June 2022 in Los Angeles. The film moved to post-production by November 2022, with the distribution rights being sold by AGC International to Paramount Pictures and other companies for multiple countries outside the United States. The rights for the UK and Ireland were sold to Signature Entertainment.

References

External links
 

Upcoming films
American comedy films
American mystery films
American heist films
Upcoming directorial debut films
Films shot in Los Angeles